The Roman Catholic Diocese of Chitré (erected 21 July 1962) is a suffragan diocese of the Archdiocese of Panamá.

Bishops

Ordinaries
José María Carrizo Villarreal (1963–1994)
José Luis Lacunza Maestrojuán, O.A.R. (1994–1999), appointed Bishop of David; future Cardinal
Fernando Torres Durán (1999–2013)
Rafael Valdivieso Miranda (since 2013)

Other priest of this diocese who became bishop
José Domingo Ulloa Mendieta (priest here, 1983-1988), appointed Auxiliary Bishop of Panamá

See also
Catholic Church in Panama

References

External links
 

Chitre
Chitre
Chitre
1962 establishments in Panama
Roman Catholic Ecclesiastical Province of Panamá